Pauline Tanyaradzwa Adele "Tanya" Fear (born ) is a British actress and comedian. She had a recurring role on the 2015 television series Spotless and appeared in the Doctor Who episode "Arachnids in the UK" in 2018. In 2021 she announced that she would use the name Tanyaradzwa Fear professionally, having previously been credited as Tanya Fear.

After not being offered any roles since 2018, Fear announced in August 2022 that she was leaving the film and television industry.

Early life
Fear was born in London, UK. Her father, Andrew Stephen Fear, is English while her mother, Yvonne Zolisa Marimo, was born in Zimbabwe. Fear used the name Tanya from an early age, a shortened form of her name Tanyaradzwa, which means "we have been comforted" in her mother's native Shona language.

While pursuing a degree in Comparative Literature at King's College London, Fear made the decision to pursue her dream of acting, moving to Los Angeles in 2009 for a few months. She then trained at Identity School of Acting back in London.

Career
Fear's first screen work was in the original 2010 television pilot for the British series The Fades; the pilot was unaired, but did lead to the series being picked up by BBC, with a different cast. She appeared in the 2013 movie Kick-Ass 2, as well as television series including Some Girls (2013), DCI Banks (2015), and Doctor Who (2018). In 2020, working with the precautions implemented during the COVID-19 pandemic in California, Fear wrote, directed and appeared in a series of three romantic comedy short films examining love during the pandemic: Shoot Your Shot, Shoot Your Shot 2: An International Affair, and Shoot Your Shot 3: The Wedding.

Awards and accolades
In 2019, BAFTA Los Angeles name Fear on its list of 25 Rising Stars.

Personal life
In April 2021, Fear announced that she had chosen to follow the lead of fellow actress Thandie Newton, also of mixed Zimbabwean-British descent, who had announced a few days earlier that she would use the full spelling of her Zimbabwean given name professionally, subsequently being credited as Thandiwe Newton. Fear will now use the full spelling of her birth name in the name she uses professionally, subsequently being credited as Tanyaradzwa Fear.

On 9 September 2021, Fear's UK-based family reported to the Los Angeles Police Department (LAPD) that Fear was missing from her Hollywood Bowl area apartment. The family reached out to American and British media, which reported the story early on 13 September. The family's own social media efforts resulted in a possible sighting at a Los Angeles grocery store at a nearby location on Santa Monica Boulevard on 12 September; the LAPD reported that Fear was found safe in the afternoon of 13 September, with one news outlet stating that she was receiving undisclosed treatment in a local hospital.

Filmography

See also
List of solved missing person cases

References

External links

Year of birth missing (living people)
2020s missing person cases
21st-century British actresses
Black British actresses
Alumni of King's College London
English people of Zimbabwean descent
English film actresses
English television actresses
Formerly missing people
Living people
Missing person cases in California